Moisés García Rosa (born 31 October 1989) is a Spanish professional footballer who plays for Hércules CF as a central defender.

Club career
Born in Seville, García joined local Sevilla FC's youth system at the age of eight, making his senior debut with the C side in the 2008–09 season, in the Tercera División. On 31 January 2009 he first appeared with the reserves, starting and scoring the equaliser in a 1–1 away draw against Albacete Balompié in the Segunda División.

On 20 July 2011, García rejected a new deal from the Andalusians and signed with another reserve team, Sporting de Gijón B of the Segunda División B. He made his main squad – and La Liga – debut on 14 April 2012, starting in a 3–1 loss at Real Madrid.

On 9 July 2013, García joined CD Ourense also in division three. After the Galicians' dissolution, he moved to fellow league club UD Logroñés on 26 June of the following year.

García continued competing in the third tier the following years, representing FC Cartagena, San Fernando CD and Hércules CF.

References

External links

1989 births
Living people
Spanish footballers
Footballers from Seville
Association football defenders
La Liga players
Segunda División players
Segunda División B players
Tercera División players
Sevilla FC C players
Sevilla Atlético players
Sporting de Gijón B players
Sporting de Gijón players
CD Ourense footballers
UD Logroñés players
FC Cartagena footballers
San Fernando CD players
Hércules CF players